Aurukun Airport  is an airport in Aurukun, Queensland, Australia.

Airlines and destinations

See also
 List of airports in Queensland

References

Airports in Queensland